La Pierreuse (meaning "stony place") is a large and important nature reserve in the Swiss Alps, in the canton of Vaud.
It covers more than 30 square km south of the Saane in the district of Pays-d'Enhaut. It is located at the foot of the Gummfluh.

See also 
 Nature parks in Switzerland

External links
 Description of la Pierreuse

Nature reserves in Switzerland
Geography of the canton of Vaud
Tourist attractions in the canton of Vaud
Protected areas of the Alps